Implacable Three is a 1963 Spanish/Italian mystery western film directed by Joaquín Luis Romero Marchent, written by José Mallorquí and starring Geoffrey Horne, Paul Piaget and Fernando Sancho, it is considered one of the earliest Spaghetti Western films.

Cast

References

External links
 

Films directed by Joaquín Luis Romero Marchent
Films with screenplays by Joaquín Luis Romero Marchent
Spanish Western (genre) films
Italian Western (genre) films
Spaghetti Western films
1963 Western (genre) films
1963 films
Something Weird Video
1960s Italian films